Henry Finnis Blosse Lynch, MA, FRGS (18 April 1862 – 24 November 1913) was a British traveller, businessman, and Liberal Member of Parliament.

Biography
Lynch was the only son of the Mesopotamian explorer Thomas Kerr Lynch, of a landed Irish family based at Partry House, County Mayo, and Harriet Taylor, the daughter of Colonel Robert Taylor, a British political resident at Baghdad, and his Armenian wife. He was born in London and educated at Eton College, the University of Heidelberg, and Trinity College, Cambridge, where he studied classics.  Although called to the bar from the Middle Temple in 1887, he eschewed a career in law in favour of working for his family business, Lynch Brothers, a commercial firm founded in Baghdad in 1841 which exported goods from Britain to Mesopotamia. He became the company's chairman in 1896.

Lynch was admitted as a freeman of the Worshipful Company of Bowyers of the City of London in 1888.

Lynch was elected at the 1906 general election as Member of Parliament (MP) for Ripon, but was defeated at the January 1910 general election.

Lynch died, unmarried, of pneumonia in a hotel in Calais in 1913. He left half of his estate to Trinity College. He also bequeathed a large number of middle-eastern artefacts to the British Museum. Photographs by Lynch are held by the British Library and in the Conway Library at The Courtauld Institute of Art whose archive, of primarily architectural images, is being digitised under the wider Courtauld Connects project.

Travel to Armenia
Lynch wrote a two-volume book on Armenia, which were published in 1901. A reviewer wrote in the journal Man: "The result is this magnificently printed and illustrated mixture of travel notes and impressions, historical and archaeological research, political ratiocination, and geographical information." Another reviewer wrote in The Geographical Journal: "Mr. Lynch's book is full of information, but from a geographical point of view, it is somewhat disappointing. In the descriptions of scenery there is occasionally such a flow of words that the reader is apt to be wearied and lose the impression which the writer intends to convey." Martin Conway described it in 1916 as a "classical work on the country" and added that his "journeys in Armenia and close study of the country made him beyond question the greatest recent authority upon it."

In 2015, a first edition of his two-volume book, Armenia. Travels and Studies, sold for £2000 at Sotheby's.

References

External links 
 
 
 

1862 births
1913 deaths
British people of Armenian descent
British people of Irish descent
Liberal Party (UK) MPs for English constituencies
Members of the Middle Temple
UK MPs 1906–1910
People educated at Eton College
Alumni of Trinity College, Cambridge
Heidelberg University alumni
Fellows of the Royal Geographical Society
High Sheriffs of Mayo